Alexei Andreyevich Kolosov (born 4 January 2002) is a Belarusian professional ice hockey goaltender who currently plays for Dinamo Minsk in the Kontinental Hockey League (KHL). Internationally he played for the Belarusian national team at the 2021 World Championship, as well as at several junior tournaments. One of the top ranked goaltenders for the 2021 NHL Entry Draft, Kolosov was selected 78th overall by the Philadelphia Flyers.

Playing career
Kolosov started the 2020–21 season with Dinamo-Molodechno of the Belarusian Extraliga. However as travel restrictions due to the COVID-19 pandemic led made the main goaltenders for Dinamo Minsk unavailable, Kolosov made his Kontinental Hockey League (KHL) debut. He had also agreed to terms with the Erie Otters of the Ontario Hockey League, a major junior league in Canada and the United States, who had selected him 22nd overall in the 2020 CHL Import Draft. Kolosov played 9 games for Dinamo during the season, and was later named to the Belarusian national team for the 2021 World Championship.

In the leadup to the 2021 NHL Entry Draft, the National Hockey League's Central Scouting Bureau ranked Kolosov the second-highest European-based goaltender. He was selected in the third round, 78th overall, by the Philadelphia Flyers.

International
Kolosov made his international debut at the 2019 World U18 Championships, where he played four games for the Belarusian under-18 team, winning one. He next played at the 2020 World Junior Championship Division IA level, appearing in three games and finishing with two wins and one loss.

Kolosov made his senior debut with the Belarus national team at the 2021 World Championship, appearing in four games and recording two losses. He also played at the 2022 World Junior Championship Division IA, and won all five games he played in, helping Belarus earn promotion to the top level for 2023.

Career statistics

Regular season and playoffs

International

References

External links

2002 births
Living people
Belarusian ice hockey goaltenders
HC Dinamo Minsk players 
Philadelphia Flyers draft picks 
Ice hockey people from Minsk